László Karaffa (born 19 July 1964) is a Hungarian sprinter. He competed in the men's 4 × 100 metres relay at the 1988 Summer Olympics.

References

1964 births
Living people
Athletes (track and field) at the 1988 Summer Olympics
Hungarian male sprinters
Olympic athletes of Hungary
Place of birth missing (living people)